Laura Friedman (born December 3, 1966) is an American politician serving in the California State Assembly and a candidate for California's 30th congressional district. A Democrat, she represents the 43rd Assembly District, encompassing the cities of Glendale, Burbank, the unincorporated community of La Crescenta-Montrose, and northern portions of Los Angeles, including Studio City and Sherman Oaks.

Prior to her election to the Assembly in 2016, Friedman was a member of the Glendale City Council. She also served as Mayor of Glendale from 2011 to 2012. She is the author of a landmark pro-housing bill to eliminate minimum parking requirements for housing near mass transit stations throughout the state of California; the bill was signed into law in 2022.

In January 2023, Friedman launched her candidacy for California's 30th congressional district. The incumbent representative, Adam Schiff, is vacating the seat to run in the 2024 United States Senate election in California.

Career
Between 1994 and 1997, Friedman was the Vice President of Development at Rysher Entertainment, where she oversaw the production of approximately ten feature films annually as well as extensive television programming.
In 1995, Friedman was the co-producer of the Warner Brothers release It Takes Two. In 1996 she was associate producer of House Arrest; executive producer of Foxfire; executive producer of the family film Zeus and Roxanne; and associate producer of the independent film Aberration, which was released by LIVE Entertainment. Between 1998 and 1999, Friedman was the Vice President of Development at Cort/Madden Company. Since 2000, Friedman has owned and managed a small business (PlanetGlass.net), a web-based art glass dealership.

In April 2011, Friedman became the mayor of Glendale, California.

California State Assembly 
After serving seven years on the Glendale City Council, including a term as the Mayor of Glendale, Laura Friedman was elected to the California State Assembly in 2016. During her first term in office, Laura authored a package of bills to establish landmark water efficiency standards, strengthen environmental sustainability, improve access to higher education, health care, and transportation alternatives, and create new avenues for communities to tackle the affordable housing crisis. In addition, she secured $20 million in funding for the completion of the Glendale Riverwalk Project, which for the first time will provide a safe bicycle and pedestrian connection from Glendale to Griffith Park. She has been tapped for several leadership roles in the legislature and currently serves as the Assistant Speaker pro Tempore for the Assembly and the Chair of the Assembly Select Committee on Small Business and Entrepreneurship. As the Chair of the Joint Rules Subcommittee on Sexual Harassment Prevention and Response, she's led a historic bicameral and bipartisan reform of the legislature's response to sexual harassment that's become a model for other states and local governments.

She also introduced the California legislative bill, AB-44, which made the sale and manufacture of new fur products illegal in California. It was signed into law by Governor Gavin Newsom on October 12, 2019, in Sacramento.

On September 7, she delayed the release of $4 billion of voter approved bonds for the California High Speed Rail, stating that the California High Speed Rail Authority has "not provided us any real details about what the money would go towards this year". The CHSRA Chief Financial Officer, Brian Annis, countered by stating that the CHSRA already presented to the legislature the expenditure plan in February 2021 and that this delayed release by Friedman could cause budget delays to snowball.

Electoral history

2016

2018

2020

Personal life
Born to a Jewish family, Friedman was raised in South Florida. She earned a Bachelor of Arts from the University of Rochester in New York. She is married to Guillaume Lemoine, a professional landscape designer. The couple has a daughter, Rachel, born in 2013.

References

External links 
 
 Laura Friedman at ballotpedia.org
 Join California Laura Friedman

Living people
Mayors of Glendale, California
Women mayors of places in California
Businesspeople from California
University of Rochester alumni
1966 births
Democratic Party members of the California State Assembly
Women state legislators in California
21st-century American politicians
21st-century American women politicians
Candidates in the 2024 United States House of Representatives elections